David Meunier (born David Miller; February 5, 1973) is an American actor.

Early life
Meunier was born in Woodburn, Oregon. He played football in high school, and a teammate convinced him to try out for a school production of Guys and Dolls. He was cast as Nathan Detroit and the experience got him hooked on acting. He later moved to California to attend college. He also attended school in France.

Career
Meunier portrayed Johnny Crowder on the television series Justified, and has had roles in series such as Revolution and Jericho. He appeared in the 2014 film adaptation of the 1980s television series The Equalizer. He also appeared as Lieutenant Greitzer in Pirates of the Caribbean: At World's End.

Personal life
Meunier is married to actress Faline England. He reportedly speaks fluent French.

Filmography

Film

Television

Video games

References

External links

Living people
1973 births
American male television actors
American male film actors
American male video game actors
20th-century American male actors
21st-century American male actors
Male actors from Oregon